Somatostatin receptors are receptors for the ligand somatostatin, a small neuropeptide associated with neural signaling, particularly in the post-synaptic response to NMDA receptor co-stimulation/activation. Somatostatin is encoded by a CRE and is very susceptible to gene promoter region activation by transcription factor CREB.

There are five known somatostatin receptors:

 SST1
 SST2
 SST3
 SST4
 SST5

All are G protein-coupled seven transmembrane receptors.

References

External links
 

G protein-coupled receptors